Buena Vista Lake was a fresh-water lake in Kern County, California, in the Tulare Lake Basin in the southern San Joaquin Valley, California.

Buena Vista Lake was the second largest of several similar lakes in the Tulare Lake basin, and was fed by the waters of the Kern River.  The Kern River's flow went into Buena Vista Lake southwest through the site of Bakersfield via its main distributary channels or south through the Kern River Slough distributary into Kern Lake and then into Buena Vista Lake via Connecting Slough.

In times when Buena Vista Lake overflowed it first backed up into Kern Lake making one large lake.  When this larger lake overflowed it flowed out through the Buena Vista Slough and Kern River channel northwest of Buena Vista Lake through tule marshland and Goose Lake, into Tulare Lake.

Today Lake Webb and Lake Evans occupy the lakebed on the northern shore of the former Buena Vista Lake.

Tulamniu Indian Site 

On Buena Vista Lake south shores was the site of the Tulamniu Indians, who spoke Buena Vista Yokuts. The site is a California Historical Landmark number 374.

California Historical Landmark reads:
NO. 374 TULAMNIU INDIAN SITE - The old Yokuts village of Tulamniu was named Buena Vista by Spanish Commander Fages in 1772. Fr. Zalvidea again recorded the site in 1806. This village was occupied for several centuries, and in 1933-34 its site was excavated by the Smithsonian Institution.

See also
 List of lakes in California
California Historical Landmarks in Kern County
California Historical Landmark

References

External links
 David A. Fredrickson, BUENA VISTA LAKE (CA-KER-116) REVISITED, This article originally appeared in Symposium: A New Look at some Old Sites, Papers from the Symposium Organized by Francis A. Riddell, Presented at the Annual Meeting of the Society for California Archaeology, March 23-26, 1983, San Diego, California. Coyote Press Archives of California Prehistory 6:75-81, 1986.
 Fishing In Lake Buena Vista, California  LIVESTRONG.COM
  THE PRELIMINARY RESULTS OF THE 2008 ARCHAEOLOGICAL INVESTIGATIONS AT THE BEAD HILL SITE (KER-450), BUENA VISTA LAKE, CALIFORNIA; AMBER BARTON, MARIA DEL CARMEN GUZMAN, AND BREEANN ROMO, CALIFORNIA STATE UNIVERSITY, BAKERSFIELD
 Margaret Aseman Cooper Zonlight, Land, water, and settlement in Kern County, California, 1850-1890, Arno Press Inc., 1979

Former lakes of the United States
Lakes of Kern County, California
Tulare Basin watershed
Endorheic lakes of California
Geography of the San Joaquin Valley
History of the San Joaquin Valley
Kern River
Natural history of the Central Valley (California)
Yokuts
El Camino Viejo
Lakes of California
Lakes of Southern California